The 2015 North Carolina A&T Aggies football team represented North Carolina A&T State University as a member of Mid-Eastern Athletic Conference (MEAC) during the 2015 NCAA Division I FCS football season. Led by fifth-year head coach Rod Broadway, the Aggies compiled an overall record of 10–2 with a mark of 7–1 in conference play, placing in a three-way tie for the MEAC title with Bethune–Cookman and North Carolina Central. North Carolina A&T was invited to inaugural Celebration Bowl, where the Aggies defeated Southwestern Athletic Conference (SWAC), champion Alcorn State, earning the program's fourth black college football national championship. North Carolina A&T played home games at Aggie Stadium in Greensboro, North Carolina.

Previous season
The Aggies finished the season 9–3, 6–2 in MEAC play to finish in a five-way tie, earning the school's seventh MEAC championship and 12th conference title. Due to the MEAC tiebreaker system, A&T did not earn the conference's automatic bid to the FCS Playoffs and did not receive an at-large bid.

Before the season
At the conclusion of the 2014 football season, the Aggies lost key players such as All-American center Ronald Canty, All-American and three-time All-MEAC standout guard/tackle William Ray Robinson III and 2014 starting right guard Olin Leak and defensive back Donald Mattocks. In addition, one of the best tacklers in school history, All-MEAC linebacker D’Vonte Grant, played his final season with the Aggies. NC A&T was picked to win the MEAC championship and junior running back Tarik Cohen was selected as the preseason offensive player of the year.

Recruiting

Schedule

Roster

Coaching staff

Game summaries

Shaw

This game marked the 21st meeting overall between the Shaw University Bears and the Aggies, and the first between the two in 52 Years. Going into the match up, the Aggies held the all-time series at 3–17–1. The last meeting between the two in 1968, saw The Aggies defeat the Bears 0–69.

The Aggies called upon redshirt freshman quarterback Lamar Raynard to be the starting quarterback. Raynard passed for 188 yards with three touchdowns and 1 interception. Junior Wide Receiver Denzel Keyes went on to make a career-high six catches to finish with 119 yards receiving and two touchdowns. Preseason All-American & MEAC Offensive player of the year, running back Tarik Cohen, ran for 106 yards and two touchdowns on 21 carries. This game marked Cohen's 13th career 100-yard game. Cohen is now 928 rushing yards short of becoming the all-time leading rusher in school history.

The Bears were held to 44 yards on the ground in 30 attempts. Bruce Parker Jr. returned an interception 85 yards for a touchdown for the team's lone score.

UNC

This game marked the first meeting between the Tar Heels and the Aggies. The Aggies last saw an opponent from the ACC in 2004, with a 42–3 loss to Wake Forest.

Elon

This game marked the 11th meeting between A&T and nearby In-state FCS opponent Elon. Goin into the game, the Aggies held a 7–4 all-time record against the Phoenix, with the Aggies getting a 17–12 victory on the road in 2014.

Hampton

This game marked the 44th meeting between A&T and Hampton. Going into the game, Hampton held a 26–16–2 all-time record against the A&T, with the Aggies winning the last meeting 31–14 in front of a home crowd.

Norfolk State

This game marked the 39th meeting between the Aggies and Norfolk State and the first game between the two since 2012. Going into the game, A&T held a 28–11 all-time record against the Spartans, with the Aggies winning the last meeting 30–9 in front of a near capacity Homecoming crowd.

Bethune-Cookman

This game marked the 36th meeting between the A&T and Bethune-Cookman and the first game between the two since 2012. Going into the game, Bethune-Cookman held a 22–14 all-time record against the Aggies, with the Wildcats winning the last meeting 28–12 in Daytona Beach, FL.

Howard

This game marked the 38th meeting between the A&T and Howard. Going into the game, A&T held a 26–20–2 all-time record against the Bison, with the Aggies winning the last meeting 38–22 in 2014. For the first time this season, the Aggies are nationally ranked, breaking into the top 25 at #24.

Junior Running Back Tarik Cohen rushed for 137 yards and three touchdowns as North Carolina A&T rolled over 0–7 Howard in the Aggies' Homecoming game. Quarterback Kwashaun Quick threw for 67 yards and one touchdown and rushed for 85 yards and another score, while Amos Williams also rushed for 85 yards and one touchdown. On the Bison's side, Quarterback Kalen Johnson threw for 163 yards and two touchdowns. Howard was able to establish a 14–13 lead until Cohen broke for a 31-yard touchdown run with 5:13 left in the second quarter. The Aggies then quickly added 10 more points to go into halftime with a 30–14 lead. In the second half, the Aggies scored 34 unanswered points. Howard were never able to mount a rushing attack as A&T compiled 311 rushing yards and held the Bison to only 31.

The win secures A&T's fourth straight winning season.

Florida A&M

This game will mark the 63rd meeting between the A&T and Florida A&M. Going into the game, Florida A&M holds a 44–16–3 all-time record against the Aggies, with the A&T winning the last meeting 40–21 in 2014.

South Carolina State

This game will mark the 53rd meeting between the A&T and rival South Carolina State. Going into the game, South Carolina State holds a 32–18–2 all-time record against the Aggies, with the Bulldogs shutting out A&T 13–0 in the 2014 Atlanta Football Classic.

With both North Carolina A&T and South Carolina State being the top two defenses in the MEAC, the contest was low scoring and heavily relied upon the team's defensive lines. In the final play of the game, SC State Kicker Tyler Scandrett missed a 33-yard field goal attempt as time expired. This win was the first time, and the 2nd in 16 attempts, since 1969 that the aggies defeated rival SC State inside Dawson Stadium, ending a 14-game losing streak.

Delaware State

This game marked the 44th meeting between the A&T and Delaware State. Going into the game, Delaware State held a 22–21–1 all-time record against the Aggies, with A&T winning the last meeting 33–20.

The Aggies kept Delaware State scoreless until six minutes into the fourth quarter, leading 13–0. Delaware state's Brycen Alleyne scored on a four-yard run giving the Hornets their only points of the game. Following the hornet's kickoff, Senior Tony McRae returned the ball far a 75-yard touchdown. The Aggies were able to keep the hornets from scoring again after stopping quarterback Kobe Lain short on a 4th down run. The Aggies took over possession at their own 28-yard line and in 9 plays drove the ball 72 yards, with the drive ending in a touchdown.

North Carolina Central

This game marks the 87th meeting between A&T and arch rival North Carolina Central. Going into the game, the Aggies hold a 49–32–5 all-time record against the Eagles. In the 2014 Meeting between the two schools, the Eagles upset the Aggies 21–14, taking the outright MEAC championship from them and creating a 5-way tie which gave Morgan State the conference automatic bid to the NCAA playoffs. Going into the game, the Aggies ranked 13th in the FCS coaches poll, had allowed opponents only 73.7 rushing yards per game to top the NCAA Division I-FCS.

The Eagles amassed 393 yards of total offense, including 193 yards on the ground. With the loss to NCCU, the Aggies shared the MEAC Championship with their arch rival for the second year in a row.

Alcorn State – Celebration Bowl

This game marks the inaugural Celebration Bowl Game, and only the 2nd meeting between the Aggies and Alcorn State. In their 2004 meeting, the Aggies lost to the Braves 13–15 in Lorman, MS. By virtue of the MEAC tiebreaker system, the Aggies were invited to the Celebration bowl vs Alcorn State, who defeated Grambling State in the 2015 SWAC championship game.

The game's first quarter showcased both Alcorn and A&T's special teams. A&T punt returner Khris Gardin scoring the first touchdown of the game with at 74-yard return from Alcorn's 26-yard line. Alcorn's game, Anthony Williams returned the favor moments later with an 84-yard punt return to pull Alcorn State within 7–6. Running Back Tarik Cohen made scoring runs of 74 and 83 yards out of the Aggies' next two possessions, and A&T pushed its lead to 24–6 when Kicker Cody Jones was completed a 45-yard field goal with 11:31 left in the first half. Tarik Cohen was able to drive a 73-yard touchdown with 4:17 left in the game to put A&T up by 7. Alcorn then attempted 4 passes from A&T's 9-yard line in the final possession of the game to all come up incomplete, giving A&T the first ever Celebration Bowl victory.

Tarik Cohen and Lineman Denzel Jones were named offensive and defensive most valuable players. Cohen rushed for 295 yards, recording his fourth career 200-yard rushing performance and 3rd best single game performance in A&T history. He now ties Maurice Hicks for the most 200-yard plus games in an Aggies career. Additionally, Cohen's performance has helped him set a new School record for most rushing yards in a single season with 1,543 and 15 Touchdowns.
on the defensive side, Jones had 7 tackles and 1 interception. Khris Gardin's performance helped him break the NCAA FCS records for punt return yards in season with 740 punt return yards. Additionally His 61.7 punt return yards per game is also a new NCAA record. Aggies junior kicker Cody Jones made two field goals from 40 yards or more. It is the first time in his career he has accomplished the feat. He has made five kicks in his career of 40 yards or more. The Aggies are now 13–12 all-time against the SWAC, and the teams' 543 yards of total offense are the most the Aggies have compiled in the five-year Broadway era.

Post season
As the 2015 college football season neared the end, many organizations began to announce finalists and winners of various past-season awards. Aggie players and coaches appeared on many of these lists. Several players for the Aggies were honored with awards and accolades including Junior running back Tarik Cohen, Redshirt Sophomore Offensive Lineman Brandon Parker, and Sophomore punt returner Khris Gardin.

Cohen was named MEAC Offensive player of the year for the second year in a row. He is the first Aggie football player since Connell Maynor to win back-to-back offensive player of the year awards. Cohen led the MEAC in rushing and recorded his third straight 1,000 yard season with 1,248 total yards.
Parker was named MEAC Offensive Lineman of the year and is only the second Aggie in school history win the award, following Qasim Mitchell, who claimed the award in 2001. Parker did not allow a single sack from his left tackle position through 11 games and only had two penalties called against him this season while registering 4.32 pancake blocks per game. The offensive line accounted for 3,902 total offensive yards including 1,960 yards on the ground, making the Aggies the second-best rushing offense in the MEAC.

Gardin received All-American honors from STATS FCS (first team), BOXTOROW, and the FCS Athletics Directors Association. Additionally, he was also named first-team All-MEAC as a return specialist. Gardin, who also holds the school record for punt returns in a season, set a new NCAA FCS records for punt return yards in both a single season and also average punt return yards per game, is the first first-team All-American punt returner for the Aggies since Curtis Deloatch in 2001.

The following A&T players were also named to the All–MEAC First, Second, and Third Teams:

2016 NFL draft
The 2016 NFL Draft was held on April 28–30, 2017 at the Auditorium Theater and Grant Park in Chicago, Illinois. The following A&T players were either selected or signed as undrafted free agents following the draft.

2016 CFL draft
The 2016 CFL Draft took place on May 10, 2016. The following A&T players were either selected or signed as undrafted free agents following the draft.

Ranking movements

Notes

References

North Carolina AandT
North Carolina A&T Aggies football seasons
Black college football national champions
Mid-Eastern Athletic Conference football champion seasons
Celebration Bowl champion seasons
North Carolina AandT Aggies football